"Be My World" is a song by the Italian House group Milky. It was released in 2003 on Robbins Entertainment, Universal Music Group, Multiply Records and Motivo Productions as the third single and as well as the second track from their only studio album, Star (2002). It is a dance-pop song that was written and produced by Giuliano Sacchetto and Giordano Trivellato.

Track listing

Charts

References

External links
 
 
 
 

2003 singles
2002 songs
Milky songs
Universal Music Group singles
Multiply Records singles